Jakovica is a small village west of Laze in the Municipality of Logatec in the Inner Carniola region of Slovenia.

Church

The local church in the settlement is dedicated to Saint Michael and belongs to the Parish of Planina. A small chapel, built at the source of an artesian spring believed to have healing properties, particularly for various eye diseases and disorders, is dedicated to the Virgin Mary.

References

External links 

Jakovica on Geopedia
Jakovica on Google Maps (map, photographs, street view)

Populated places in the Municipality of Logatec